HD 54893, often called A Puppis is a suspected variable star in the constellation Puppis. Its apparent magnitude is 4.83 and is approximately 860 light years away based on parallax.

The spectral class of B2IV/V suggest it is on the border between the main sequence and the subgiant branch. Evolutionary models show it is towards the end of the main sequence at an age of about 22 million years.

In a 1971 paper, HD 54893 is mentioned as being a confirmed β Cephei variable, but with no explanation of when it was discovered.  A 1971 thesis dedicated to β Cephei variables only mentions HD 54893 as a non-variable early B star.  In a 1977 search for β Cephei stars, it is listed as possibly being variable.  It is catalogued as a suspected variable star, but not confirmed.

References

Puppis
B-type subgiants
Beta Cephei variables
Suspected variables
CD-39 3105
054893
2702
034495
Puppis, A